This is a list of managers of FC Dinamo Bucharest by season since its founding in 1948.

Dinamo